You Should Have Left is a 2020 American psychological horror film written and directed by David Koepp, based on the 2017 book of the same name by Daniel Kehlmann. It stars Kevin Bacon, and Amanda Seyfried. Jason Blum served as a producer through his Blumhouse Productions banner.

Originally intended to be theatrically released, the film was released digitally via Premium VOD on June 18, 2020, by Universal Pictures. It received mixed reviews from critics.

Plot
Theodore Conroy is a retired banker married to Susanna, a much younger woman, and they have a daughter named Ella. Theo is a jealous husband and constantly fears Susanna, a successful Hollywood actress, is cheating on him.

The family books a vacation in Wales, but there is something strange about the house—time passes unusually fast, and everybody experiences  nightmares while staying there. The couple also discovers that neither one of them made the booking, each thinking the other did it.

One night, Ella sees the shadow of a man on the wall. The next morning, she asks Susanna why people dislike Theo. Susanna reluctantly explains that Theo's first wife drowned in the bathtub, and people suspected that he killed her, though he was acquitted at trial. While in town for supplies, the shopkeeper asks if he has met Stetler, who Theo presumes is the home owner. He mysteriously gives Theo a drafting triangle and tells him to measure the right angles, leaving Theo confused.

Theo wrestles with feelings of jealousy and mistrust toward Susanna. One evening, while she is taking a bath, Theo checks the messages on her phone and laptop. Theo has a dream that night and sees someone has written in his meditation journal: "You should leave. Go now." The following morning, as he watches Susanna and Ella playing outside, he texts her. At the same time he sees Susanna look at her phone, he hears a text vibration on the kitchen counter and finds an identical phone with his messages on the screen. Realizing that she has a secret phone, he suspects she has been cheating on him. He confronts Susanna, and she admits to an affair with another actor. Theo asks her to leave for the night, and she goes into town to stay at an inn.

He returns to his journal to see that someone has now written “You should have left. Now it’s too late.” Upon discovering an anomaly in the angle between the wall and floor, they measure the kitchen and find that it is larger inside than outside. Ella and Theo get separated; the two of them appear to be experiencing separate visions in the dream world. Once reunited, Theo calls Susanna, wanting her to come back and take him and Ella away from the house, but her phone is turned off. He then calls the shopkeeper, inquiring whether he knows of any cab services in the area. The shopkeeper replies that there are none and speaks of the house cryptically, saying that the Devil collects souls from there.

Desperate to escape the house, Theo and Ella decide to go to town by foot, but see a shadowy figure observing them from inside as they walk away from it. After some time, they find they have circled back to the house. Seeing no other option, they stay there for the night, but Theo enters the dream world again and sees his and Susanna's past selves as they first arrived at the house. He then meets Stetler, who has taken Ella captive. He takes Theo's form to taunt him and says he will return Ella on the condition that Theo does "what he must." Ella is returned, relieving Theo.

The next day, Susanna returns to the house, and Theo gives her Ella. He finally confesses to the true circumstances surrounding the death of his first wife: he did not directly kill her, but did not help when she was drowning; he simply watched her die because he had been miserable with her for so long. He accepts that he belongs in the house. Theo's spirit is then seen trapped inside the house, revealing he had been the figure watching himself and Ella leave the night before, having tried to warn his past self by writing the messages in his journal. The shopkeeper's voice says that some people do not leave the house and that "the place finds them anyway."

Cast
 Kevin Bacon as Theo Conroy/Stetler
 Amanda Seyfried as Susanna
 Avery Essex as Ella
 Colin Blumenau as Shopkeeper 
 Lowri-Ann Richards as Welsh Woman

Production
In March 2018, it was announced Kevin Bacon would star in the film, with David Koepp directing and writing, based on the novel of the same name by Daniel Kehlmann; Koepp and Bacon had previously collaborated on the 1999 film Stir of Echoes. Jason Blum served as a producer under his Blumhouse Productions banner. In June 2018, Amanda Seyfried joined the cast of the film.

Filming took place at various locations in Wales, including at the Life House in Llanbister, Radnorshire.
Shooting also took place in Jersey City, New Jersey.

Music
The film's score was composed by Geoff Zanelli. Back Lot Music released the soundtrack on June 18, 2020, coinciding with the film's streaming release.

Release
You Should Have Left was released digitally via PVOD on June 18, 2020 by Universal Pictures. Universal decided to forego the film's originally scheduled theatrical release in the United States and Canada due to movie theater closures since mid-March, because of COVID-19 pandemic restrictions.

Reception

VOD sales 
In its first weekend, the film was the second-most rented on FandangoNow and the iTunes Store. In its second weekend, it fell to number three and number six, respectively. In its third weekend the film placed sixth on FandangoNow, but ranked second on Spectrum's weekly chart, then the following weekend placed fifth on both services. Over the weekend of July 31, Universal lowered the price of the film from $19.99 to $5.99, and You Should Have Left finished second on FandangoNow and fifth at Apple TV.

Critical response 
The site's critics consensus reads, "You Should Have Left hints at a genuinely creepy experience, but never quite manages to distill its intriguing ingredients into a consistently satisfying whole." At Metacritic, the film has a weighted average score of 46 out of 100, based on 27 critics, indicating "mixed or average reviews".

Kate Erbland of IndieWire gave the film a "B−" and said, "when You Should Have Left is at its best, it's unconcerned with mapping out such easy clarifications and leans into the raw madness of corrosive guilt and a house made to punish people who dare come inside its walls." Critic Terry Mesnard wrote that the larger-than-it-seems house in the film felt "ripped" from the 2000 novel House of Leaves by Mark Z. Danielewski.

References

External links
 
 
 

2020 films
2020 horror thriller films
2020s English-language films
2020 psychological thriller films
2020s psychological horror films
American horror thriller films
American psychological horror films
American psychological thriller films
Blumhouse Productions films
Films based on German novels
Films directed by David Koepp
Films involved in plagiarism controversies
Films not released in theaters due to the COVID-19 pandemic
Films produced by Jason Blum
Films scored by Geoff Zanelli
Films set in Wales
Films shot in Wales
Films shot in New Jersey
Films with screenplays by David Koepp
Universal Pictures films
2020s American films